Zekr (Arabic:ذكر) is an open source Quranic desktop application. It is an open platform Quran study tool for browsing and researching the Quran. Zekr is a Quran-based project, planned to be a universal, open source, and cross-platform application to perform most of the usual refers to the Quran, according to the project website. Zekr is included in the default installation of Sabily Linux distribution.

Zekr is capable of having multiple add-ons, that is different translation packs, themes, recitations and revelation packs.

As of Zekr 0.7.0, it is possible to search through different Quran translations both with indexed (Lucene-based) search and basic search. Moreover, this release introduces paging support for Quran text.

Zekr accepts different add-ons to make application as customizable as possible. Currently it accepts different Quraan translation packs, language packs, Quran revelation order pack and theme packs. Revelation order packs are used to sort search results based on different revelation order schemes.

Zekr comes with an NSIS installer for Windows and an Application bundle for Mac. There is always a base  package for (all) Linux machines as well as Debian packages for Debian-compliant Linux distributions.

See also 
 Quranic Arabic Corpus
 JQuranTree

References

External links 

Quran.com

Quran software
Free software programmed in Java (programming language)
Unix software
Windows text-related software
MacOS text-related software
MacOS software
Java platform software